Telšiai Bishop Vincentas Borisevičius Priest Seminary is a Roman Catholic seminary in Telšiai, Lithuania. It was founded in 1927 by Justinas Staugaitis, the first Bishop of Diocese of Telšiai .

History
After the establishment of Diocese of Telšiai in 1926, Bishop Justinas Staugaitis expressed his worries about the education of Diocese's priests whereas in Kaunas priest seminary there were only 26 Samogitian seminarians at that time. On 4 October 1927, the priest seminary in Telšiai was opened. Vincentas Borisevičius became the first rector of the seminary and later also became the second bishop of Telšiai.

After the Soviet occupation in 1940, the seminary was closed. By that time it had educated 150 priests. It was reopened in 1941 however in 1946 it was closed again.

The seminary in Telšiai was re-established in 1989 by Bishop Antanas Vaičius. Now, the seminary also has a preparative faculty as well as a minor seminary in Žemaičių Kalvarija. From 2015 until 2018  the rector of the seminary was dr. Ramūnas Norkus. In 2018 he was replaced by dr. Saulius Stumbra.

Rectors of the seminary
1927–1940 – Vincentas Borisevičius
1940–1946 – Pranciškus Ramanauskas
1946–1989 – Seminary was closed due to the Soviet occupation
1989–1993 – Kazimieras Gasčiūnas
1996–1997 – Steponas Brazdeikis
1997–2003 – Algis Genutis
2003–2006 – Antanas Lapė
2006–2008 – Vygintas Gūdeliūnas
2008–2011 – Jonas Ačas
2011–2015 – Viktoras Ačas
2015–2018 – Ramūnas Norkus
Since 2018 – Saulius Stumbra

External links
 Official website

References

Catholic seminaries in Lithuania
Buildings and structures in Telšiai County
1927 establishments in Lithuania
Educational institutions established in 1927
Telšiai